The Head Money Cases, 112 U.S. 580 (1884), also referred to as Edye v. Robertson, were a group of cases decided together by the United States Supreme Court.

Background
Pursuant to the Immigration Act of 1882, officers from the customhouse in the Port of New York began collecting a tax from ships of fifty cents for each immigrant aboard. Multiple ship owners sued because they were transporting Dutch immigrants, and the Netherlands had a treaty with the United States that seemed to prohibit the tax.

Decision
The case established the precedent that treaties, which are described in the Supremacy Clause of the US Constitution as "the supreme law of the land" equal to any domestic federal law, do not hold a privileged position above other acts of Congress. Hence, other laws affecting the "enforcement, modification, or repeal" of treaties are legitimate.

See also
Passenger Cases: A similar case covering a head tax on British immigrants.
List of United States Supreme Court cases, volume 112

External links

1884 in United States case law
United States Supreme Court cases
United States Supreme Court cases of the Waite Court
United States Treaty Clause case law
Netherlands–United States relations
Ellis Island
United States immigration and naturalization case law
Poll taxes